The Chief of Chaplains of the United States Army (CCH) is the chief supervising officer of the U.S. Army Chaplain Corps. (Chaplains do not hold commanding authority).  From 1775 to 1920, chaplains were attached to separate units. The Office of the Chief of Chaplains was created by the National Defense Act of 1920 in order to better organize the Chaplaincy. The current CCH is Chaplain (Major General) Thomas L. Solhjem.

U.S. Army Chiefs of Chaplains

See also
Armed Forces Chaplains Board
 Deputy Chief of Chaplains of the United States Army
Chiefs of Chaplains of the United States
International Military Chiefs of Chaplains Conference

References

United States Army
Chief of C